Girl You Know It's True is a 1989 album that served as the North American debut of German contemporary R&B duo Milli Vanilli. It is a version of Milli Vanilli's Europe-only release All or Nothing reconfigured and repackaged for the US market.

The album was a major success in the USA, producing five singles that entered the top 5 of the Billboard Hot 100, three of which reached the top position. In January 1990, Girl You Know It's True was certified 6× platinum by the RIAA after spending seven weeks atop the Billboard Top 200. Additionally, the album spent 41 weeks within the top 10 of the Billboard Top 200 and 78 weeks within the charts overall. The album was also certified Diamond in Canada, denoting shipments of over one million units. The success of the album earned the duo a Grammy Award for Best New Artist on February 22, 1990.

On November 16, 1990, Los Angeles Times freelancer Chuck Philips reported that the group, which consisted of reputed vocalists Rob Pilatus and Fab Morvan, did not sing a single note on the album. Arista Records dropped the act from its roster and deleted their album and its masters from their catalog, making it one of the largest-selling albums to ever be deleted. In addition to this, their Grammy Award was revoked, marking the first time a Grammy was ever rescinded from an artist.

According to producer Frank Farian, the decision to repackage All or Nothing as Girl You Know It's True was made by Arista Records president Clive Davis. In addition to including five of the tracks that originally appeared on All or Nothing ("I'm Gonna Miss You", "All or Nothing", "Baby Don't Forget My Number", "Dreams to Remember" and "Girl You Know It's True"), Girl You Know It's True featured several new tracks, including "Blame It on the Rain", which would go on to be a worldwide hit single, reaching number one on the Billboard Hot 100. In Europe, the track later appeared in an extended version on the album All or Nothing - The U.S. Remix Album.

Errors
The track orders of some US releases are out of sequence with the listings printed on their cover art, while several tracks are listed with incorrect running times, and some of the writers' credits are inconsistent with what is listed in external sources.

Track listing

Personnel

Milli Vanilli
Fab Morvan – visual performance (credited with "vocals")
Rob Pilatus – visual performance (credited with "vocals")

Session musicians
 John Davis – lead vocals (credited with "backing vocals")
 Brad Howell – lead vocals (credited with "backing vocals")
 Charles Shaw – lead vocals (credited with "backing vocals")
 P. G. Wilder – keyboards, arrangements
 Pit Loew – keyboards, arrangements
 Volker Barber – keyboards, arrangements
 Peter Weihe – guitars
Jens Gad – guitars
 Ike Turner – guitars
 Bruce Ingram – guitars
 Mel Collins – saxophone
 Curt Cress – drums, percussion
 Dino Solera – horns
 Felice Civitareale – horns
 Franz Weyerer – horns 
 Dino Solera – horns, horn arrangements
 Linda Rocco – backing vocals
 Jodie Rocco – backing vocals
 Joan Faulkner – backing vocals
 Felicia Taylor – backing vocals
 The Jackson Singers – backing vocals
 Charles Christopher – backing vocals
 Herbert Gebhard – backing vocals
 Bimey Oberreit – backing vocals
 Peter Rishavy – backing vocals

Production
 Frank Farian – producer, synthesizer programming
 Tobias Freund – engineering
 Bernd Berwanger – engineering
 Norbert Janicke – engineering
 Jens Seekamp – engineering

Charts

Weekly charts

Certifications

References

External links
Breaking stories about the Milli Vanilli lip-synching scandal archived at the LA Times

Milli Vanilli albums
1989 albums
Albums produced by Frank Farian
Juno Award for International Album of the Year albums
Arista Records albums